Gritty McDuff's Brewing Company, commonly contracted to Gritty's, is a brewery, with locations in (from south to north) Portland, Freeport, and Auburn, Maine, USA.

Gritty's began as a brewpub in Portland, founded in 1988. In 1995, a second location with a larger brewing facility was opened in Freeport.  The company experienced a downturn in sales in the late 1990s as did most craft breweries.  A third brewpub was opened in Auburn in 2005.  The company's production volume that year, 2005, was in excess of 250,000 gallons.  By 2006, Gritty's was the third largest Maine brewer, after Shipyard Brewing and D. L. Geary Brewing.

Among the microbrews produced by Gritty's was Vacationland Summer Ale, reviewed for the Hartford Courant in 2008, and Gritty McDuff's Best Bitter.  Gritty's has frequently been awarded the titles of "Maine's Best Brew Pub", "Best Maine Microbrew" and "Best Bar" in statewide polls.  In 2011 Gritty's was awarded Restaurateur of the Year by the Maine Restaurant Association.  Gritty's ales have been repeat winners at the annual Real Ale Festival in Chicago and have also appeared as Featured International Selections at the Great British Beer Festival.

To celebrate Gritty's 21st anniversary, the brewery released its 21 IPA.  The brew was created at the Freeport brewery and originally called "Punch You in the IPA", a reference to the Phish song "Punch You in the Eye".

References

External links
Official website
Article on micro & craft breweries in the Portland, ME area

Beer brewing companies based in Maine
Companies based in Portland, Maine
American companies established in 1988